Magnacolor was a color motion picture process owned by Consolidated Film Industries. Magnacolor was an offshoot of William Van Doren Kelley's 1918 subtractive color process Prizma and utilized the same bi-pack color process.  Magnacolor was succeeded as consolidated by Trucolor.

External links 
 Magnacolor on Timeline of Historical Film Colors

See also
The Girl From Calgary (1932)
The Bold Caballero (1936) 
Color motion picture film
Color photography
List of color film systems
List of film formats

Film and video technology